Life You Imagine is the fourth studio album by English singer-songwriter Matt Goss. It was released in 2013 by Decca Records and reached No. 27 on the UK album charts. The albums was his highest charted album since the Bros days. The album features a big band version of the classic Bros hit, "When Will I Be Famous" and was produced by Ron Fair. The album also features the track "Strong", which was used as part of the Susan G. Komen breast cancer awareness campaign.

Track listing
 Mustang – 3:43
 Lovely Las Vegas – 4:46
 When Will I Be Famous – 4:08
 Strong – 4:00
 I Do – 4:30
 Face my Fears – 4:05
 Evil – 4:30
 The Day We Met – 5:17
 There's Nothing Like This - 4:26
 All About The Hang - 3:52

References 

2013 albums
Matt Goss albums
Albums produced by Ron Fair